Hands of a Stranger is a 1962 American horror film directed by Newt Arnold and is unofficially the fourth film adaptation of The Hands of Orlac.

Plot
When the hands of pianist Vernon Paris are destroyed in a taxicab accident, he receives a double hand transplant from a recent murder victim. Although lead surgeon Dr. Harding declares the operation a success, Vernon is visibly distressed and seems unable to accept his new hands. Meanwhile, the doctor is questioned by Lieutenant Syms of the police department about the recent murder victim and the apparent secrecy surrounding his operating room.

Feeling sullen and still unable to deal with having someone else's hands, Vernon seeks comfort from his girlfriend, Eileen, but she is unsympathetic. As he reaches out to her, she becomes repelled by his scarred hands, knocking over a candle and setting her dress on fire. As she burns to death, Vernon becomes frozen and does nothing to save her life.

Afterwards, Vernon starts to become even more unstable and goes on a violent rampage. He visits the home of the taxi driver who caused the accident, and after being unable to play the piano for the driver's son, he knocks over and kills the young boy. Next, while at a local fair, Vernon is tortured by images of player pianos and bumper cars, and nearly strangles to death a carnival barker. He then becomes more focused on vengeance, and murders one of the doctors who assisted in the surgery, along with his fiancée.

Finally, after killing another doctor, Vernon retreats to an empty concert hall where his sister and Dr. Harding arrive shortly thereafter. He reveals his latest victim, then begins to manically pound on the piano keys, proving that he will never be able to play the instrument again. He then grabs Dr. Harding and tries to strangle him to death, but is shot and killed by Lt. Syms who arrives at the last minute.

Cast
 Paul Lukather as Dr. Gil Harding
 Joan Harvey as Dina Paris
 James Stapleton as Vernon Paris
 Ted Otis as Dr. Ross Compton
 Michael Rye as George Britton
 Laurence Haddon as Lt. Syms
 Elaine Martone as Eileen Hunter
 George Sawaya as Tony Wilder, the cab driver
 Michael Du Pont as Dr. Ken Fry
 Sally Kellerman as Sue
 David Kramer as Carnival Barker
 Irish McCalla as Holly
 Barry Gordon as "Skeet" Wilder

References

External links
 
 
 
 
 

1962 films
1962 horror films
1960s horror thriller films
Allied Artists films
American black-and-white films
Films based on French novels
Films about pianos and pianists
Films about organ transplantation
1962 directorial debut films
American horror thriller films
Films directed by Newt Arnold
Films scored by Richard LaSalle
1960s English-language films
1960s American films